Trestonia signifera is a species of beetle in the family Cerambycidae. It was described by Buquet in 1859. It is known from Martinique and Guadeloupe.

References

signifera
Beetles described in 1859